Carl August Peter Cornelius (24 December 1824 – 26 October 1874) was a German composer, writer about music, poet and translator.

Life
He was born in Mainz to Carl Joseph Gerhard (1793–1843) and Friederike (1789–1867) Cornelius, actors in Mainz and Wiesbaden. From an early age he played the violin and composed, eventually studying with Tekla Griebel-Wandall and composition with Heinrich Esser in 1841. He lived with his painter uncle Peter von Cornelius in Berlin from 1844 to 1852, and during this time he met prominent figures such as Alexander von Humboldt, the Brothers Grimm, Friedrich Rückert and Felix Mendelssohn.

Cornelius's first mature works (including the opera Der Barbier von Bagdad) were composed during his brief stay in Weimar (1852–1858). His next place of residence was Vienna, where he lived for five years. It was in Vienna that Cornelius began a friendship with Richard Wagner. At the latter's behest, Cornelius moved to Munich in 1864, where he married and fathered four children.

In Britain to this day, Cornelius's best-known work is "The Three Kings", a song for voice and piano in which the soloist sings "Three Kings from Persian lands afar ...", while from the piano is heard the chorale tune of Philipp Nicolai, Wie schön leuchtet der Morgenstern ("How brightly shines the morning star") underneath. An arrangement by Ivor Atkins of "The Three Kings" for solo voice and choir is included in the first volume of the popular David Willcocks and Reginald Jacques compilation Carols for Choirs.

During his last few years in Berlin, Cornelius wrote music criticism for several major Berlin journals and entered into friendships with Joseph von Eichendorff, Paul Heyse and Hans von Bülow. Despite his long-standing association with Wagner and Franz Liszt (the latter on occasion sought Cornelius's advice when it came to matters of orchestration), Cornelius's relations with the so-called "New German School" of composition were sometimes rocky. For instance, he did not attend the premiere of Tristan und Isolde, using the premiere of his own opera Der Cid as an excuse.

Cornelius's third and final operatic project, Gunlöd, based on the Norse eddas, was left incomplete at his death (from diabetes) in Mainz. He was buried in the city's Hauptfriedhof, and his grave can still be seen there.

Selected works 
 Der Barbier von Bagdad, opera buffa (1858)
 Brautlieder (1856)

 Weihnachtslieder, Op. 8 (1856)
 Der Cid, opera (1865)
 Stabat mater for soloists, chorus and orchestra (1849)
 Requiem ("Seele, vergiß sie nicht"), after a poem of Hebbel (1872)
 String quartets
 Gunlöd, unfinished opera in three acts (1869–1874) after the Edda (1906)
 Mass in D minor, CWV 91 for two soloists, chorus and organ, strings

References

External links
 
 
 
 
 Free scores at the Mutopia Project

1824 births
1874 deaths
19th-century classical composers
19th-century German composers
19th-century German male writers
19th-century German writers
19th-century German journalists
19th-century German male musicians
19th-century German poets
German Romantic composers
German male classical composers
German opera composers
German male journalists
German music critics
German male poets
Male opera composers
Musicians from Mainz
People from Rhenish Hesse
Pupils of Siegfried Dehn
Writers from Mainz